Stanier is a surname. Notable people with the surname include:

John Stanier (drummer) (born 1968), played with Helmet and others
John Stanier (British Army officer) (1925–2007), head of the British Army
Marny Stanier (born 1962), American TV meteorologist
Roger Stanier (1916–1982), Canadian microbiologist
William Stanier (1876–1965), Chief Mechanical Engineer of the London, Midland and Scottish Railway

See also
Stanier baronets, a UK baronetcy